David Grant Davis (12 January 1902 – 2 March 1995) was a New Zealand cricketer and judge.

Cricket career
Davis played three matches of first-class cricket for Hawke's Bay in 1920–21. They were Hawke's Bay's last three matches as a first-class team. In the second match, against Wellington, a few days before Davis's 19th birthday, Hawke's Bay followed on 286 runs in arrears and were 167 for 7 in their second innings when Davis went to the wicket. He hit 61 in half an hour, at one point hitting nine boundaries in a little over ten minutes. Nevertheless, Hawke's Bay lost by an innings and 17 runs.

He continued to play for Hawke's Bay and was also secretary of the Hawke's Bay Cricket Association until he moved to Gisborne in 1927.

Legal career
Davis was educated at Wanganui Collegiate School before becoming a law clerk in 1920. He qualified as a solicitor and practised in Waitara and Wanganui. He was appointed as a judge of the Māori Land Court in 1961.

Personal life
Davis and his wife Kathleen married in 1927 and had one daughter. He was the last surviving Hawke's Bay first-class cricketer.

References

External links

1902 births
1995 deaths
People educated at Whanganui Collegiate School
New Zealand cricketers
Hawke's Bay cricketers
20th-century New Zealand judges
Māori Land Court judges